Archenemy is someone's main enemy.

The term may also refer to:

Arch Enemy, Swedish death metal band
Archenemy Record Company
ArchEnemies, comics
Archenemy (Magic: The Gathering)
ArchEnemy, a 2009 science-fiction and fantasy novel by Frank Beddor in his The Looking Glass Wars trilogy
Archenemy (film), an American-British action film